Glenn Meyers (born June 19, 1961) is an American archer. He competed in the men's individual event at the 1984 Summer Olympics.

References

1961 births
Living people
American male archers
Olympic archers of the United States
Archers at the 1984 Summer Olympics
People from Fremont, Michigan
Pan American Games medalists in archery
Pan American Games gold medalists for the United States
Archers at the 2003 Pan American Games
Medalists at the 2003 Pan American Games